Peter Breen is a former Republican member of the Illinois House of Representatives who represented the 48th district from 2015 until 2019. The 48th district included municipalities in DuPage County including all or parts of Lombard, Glen Ellyn, Wheaton, and Lisle.

Breen earned his Bachelor of Engineering in Electrical Engineering from Vanderbilt University and his J.D. from the University of Notre Dame. Prior to election to the Illinois Legislature he was employed as the Vice President and Senior Counsel of the Thomas More Society. He served as a trustee on the Lombard Village Board and served as Lombard's Acting Village President.

Breen defeated six-term incumbent State Representative Sandra M. Pihos in the Republican primary in March 2014 with 56% of the vote. He won the general election against a write-in candidate with about 91% of the vote according to preliminary election results. In 2018, Breen lost reelection to Terra Costa Howard in a year that saw numerous suburban Republicans lose at the polls. In 2020, Breen lost again to Costa Howard.

 Breen is Executive Vice President and Head of Litigation at the Thomas More Society.

References

External links
Representative Peter Breen (R) 48th District at the Illinois General Assembly
Peter Breen for State Representative constituency and campaign website
Peter Breen at Ballotpedia

Living people
Illinois lawyers
Notre Dame Law School alumni
Vanderbilt University alumni
Republican Party members of the Illinois House of Representatives
Year of birth missing (living people)
People from Lombard, Illinois
21st-century American politicians